100 Tons of Gold is a non-fiction book written by David Leon Chandler and published by Doubleday in 1978. It chronicles the search for gold treasure inside the Victorio Peak, New Mexico.

References

1978 non-fiction books
Las Cruces, New Mexico
San Andres Mountains

Mining in New Mexico
Archaeological sites in New Mexico
Doubleday (publisher) books
Books about New Mexico